Kätlin Piirimäe (born 8 November 1995) is an Estonian athletics competitor.

She was born in Viljandi. In 2016 she graduated from Järvamaa Vocational College.

She started his athletics exercising in 2009, coached by her mother Külli Tambre. She won a bronze medal in shot put at the 2013 European Athletics Junior Championships.

She is 15-times Estonian shot put champion (2012–2022).

Her personal best in shot put is 16.80 (2013), and in discus throw is 46.80 (2017).

References

Living people
1995 births
Estonian female shot putters
Estonian female discus throwers
Sportspeople from Viljandi